Dibiyapur is a constituency of the Uttar Pradesh Legislative Assembly covering the city of Dibiyapur in the Auraiya district of Uttar Pradesh, India.

Dibiyapur is one of five assembly constituencies in the Etawah Lok Sabha constituency. Since 2008, this assembly constituency is numbered 203 amongst 403 constituencies.

Election results

2022

2017
Bharatiya Janta Party candidate Lakhan Singh won in 2017 Uttar Pradesh Legislative Elections defeating Samajwadi Party candidate Pradeep Kumar Yadav by a margin of 12,094 votes.

References

External links
 

Assembly constituencies of Uttar Pradesh
Dibiyapur